Raipur Metropolitan Region, also known as the Raipur Metropolitan Area and Greater Raipur, is the Urban Agglomeration of Raipur-Naya Raipur and some part of Durg Bhilai in the Indian state of Chhattisgarh. The area is administered by the Raipur Development Authority, Raipur Municipal Corporation and Nava Raipur Vikas Pradikaran.

Demographics
According to the 2011 census data, the total population of the Raipur metropolitan region was 2,343,334 that includes population of Raipur-Bhilai-Durg. Whose  total urban area is 800.02 km2

See also
Raipur District
Durg District

References

Regions of India